2013 Gainare Tottori season.

Competitions

J. League

Emperor's Cup
2nd round lost to Giravanz Kitakyushu

League table

J2 League

References

External links
 J.League official site

Gainare Tottori
Gainare Tottori seasons